San Juan, Puerto Rico, held an election for mayor on November 8, 2016. Among other elections, it was held concurrently with the 2016 Puerto Rico gubernatorial election. It saw the reelection of Carmen Yulín Cruz, a member of the Popular Democracy Party.

Nominees
Antonio Carmona Báez (Working People's Party)
Adrián González Costa (Puerto Rican Independence Party)
Carmen Yulín Cruz (Popular Democracy Party), incumbent mayor since 2013
Leo Díaz Urbina (New Progressive Party), former member of the Puerto Rico House of Representatives

Results

See also
2016 Puerto Rican general election

References

2016
San Juan, Puerto Rico mayoral
San Juan, Puerto Rico